Judith Laing (born 27 May 1957) is an Australian former cricketer who played as an all-rounder, batting right-handed and bowling left-arm medium. She appeared in three Test matches for Australia, all during their series against New Zealand in 1979. She played domestic cricket for New South Wales.

References

External links
 
 

1957 births
Living people
Cricketers from Sydney
Australia women Test cricketers
New South Wales Breakers cricketers